Dababa is one of three departments in Hadjer-Lamis, a region of Chad. Its capital is Bokoro.

Subdivisions
The department of Dababa is divided into three sub-prefectures:

References 

Departments of Chad
Hadjer-Lamis Region